Ek Niranjan  is a 2009 Indian Telugu-language action film written and directed by Puri Jagannadh. It stars Prabhas, Kangana Ranaut, Sonu Sood and Mukul Dev. The plot revolves around Chotu (Prabhas), who is a bounty hunter getting criminals to the police in exchange for money and how he reunites with his parents he never got to meet because he was kidnapped.

Filming took place from March 2009 to September 2009 and was shot on Hyderabad and Bangkok in addition to two songs in Switzerland. The film released on 30 October 2009 to mixed reviews, and was commercially successful at the box office. Prabhas was nominated for the Filmfare Award for Best Actor – Telugu for his performance. The film was dubbed into Tamil as Police Dada and was released on 31 May 2013. It was also dubbed in Hindi as Ek Hi Raasta: The Power, into Malayalam as Game.

Plot
Veeraiah's younger son is kidnapped by Chidambaram, who abducts children and makes them beggars. He names him as Chotu and makes him beg on streets to earn money for him. The police raid Chidambaram, and Chotu helps the police find him. The police reward Chotu for helping them. This makes Chotu realize that he can earn money by catching criminals for the police.

From then on, Chotu works for the police and catches hold of criminals whom the police are in search of. He also is in touch with Chidambaram and communicates with him so that he can tell him who his parents are, but he never told him. While getting hold of a goon, Chotu comes across Sameera, a guitar teacher who is the sister of the goon (Sravan) who works for Johnny Bhai.

The police ask Chotu to nab Sameera's brother, who is wanted by them for many crimes. When Sameera is feeding her brother, Chotu enters and forcefully arrests him after causing much havoc in the house. Chotu then falls in love with Sameera. As her brother reels behind the bars, Sameera reciprocates her love for Chotu. Veeraiah's elder son Kailash also works for Johnny Bhai, who will be arrested on charges of killing the Minister Narendra Kumar, which is planned by Johnny Bhai.

Johnny Bhai wants to kill Kailash, who is arrested, fearing that he will reveal his name to the police interrogation. Kailash escapes from the police clutches, and Johnny Bhai is in search of him. The police commissioner also asks Chotu to find Kailash and bag a handsome reward. Sameera's brother vacates his house and escapes to Bangkok, fearing Johnny Bhai. Chotu also goes to Bangkok in search of Sameera and finds Kailash there. He catches Kailash, who tells him that the minister was killed by his brother and that Kailash took the blame. Johnny Bhai kidnaps Sameera and her brother and threatens to kill them if Chotu does not hand over Kailash to him.

The story ends with Chotu rescuing Sameera from Johnny Bhai and meeting his parents.

Cast

 Prabhas as Niranjan / Chotu
 Kangana Ranaut as Sameera
 Sonu Sood as Johnny Bhai
 Mukul Dev as Kailash
 Ashish Vidyarthi
 Makrand Deshpande as Chidambaram
 Sravan as Sameera's elder brother
 Brahmanandam as Guru
 Ali as Mantra
 Sunil as Chanti Babu
 Venu Madhav as Chitti
 Chalapathi Rao as Police Commissioner
 Posani Krishna Murali as Minister Narendra Kumar
 Brahmaji as Brahmaji
 Satya Prakash as Police Inspector
 Gautam Raju as Police Constable
 Tanikella Bharani as Veeraiah
 Sangeeta as Veeraiah's wife
 Prudhviraj as ex-Minister
 Abinayasri as Guru's wife
 Baby Annie as Sameera's guitar student
 Akash Puri as Sameera's guitar student
 Jr Relangi

Production

Development
Jagganadh and Prabhas worked together for the film Bujjigadu which was an average score in the box-office, Puri decided to do the duo again for Ek Niranjan. Prabhas’s character is a strong, powerful, dynamic, rough and tough guy who is a bounty hunter. 
Kangana Ranaut, who is popular in Bollywood films, is making her debut in the Tollywood industry. Her character is said to be a guitar teacher. It was also said that she is acting in the film for a very big price of Rs. 10 million.Puri, initially, approached her for Pokiri which Ileana D'Cruz has done, but she was unable to do the film due to the dates of Gangster. Sonu Sood will essay the villain in the film. The film is described to be a mass commercial entertainer mixed with action, emotions, drama, suspense, romance and comedy to appeal to the audiences.

Filming

Ek Niranjan began shooting on 31 March 2009 in Lahari resorts and Hyderabad.
Parts of the film were shot in Switzerland, Bangkok, and Pattaya. The filming was completed in September 2009.

Release

Reception
The film received mixed reviews. Rediff gave a two-star rating commented "the film does not live up to the expectations. Technically, Puri ensures that the film is in place. He tries to earnestly build up a deft screenplay with a wafer-thin story (which is increasingly becoming his trademark). But the clichéd plot falls flat despite all the technical gimmicks (fights and all) and attempts to prop it up. However Prabhas is effortless as Chotu, he acts well and the movie is watchable for him although he has developed a similar style in all his films. Kangana's Telugu debut can't be really raved about. She looks pretty but as far as performance goes, there's nothing much to write about as the script doesn't have anything for her to showcase her acting skills". Sify gave a three-star rating and said "Prabhas has come up with a good and lively performance in the film. He has improved a lot in his dialogue delivery. He also excelled in dance sequences. Bollywood beauty Kangana Ranaut makes her debut in Tollywood with this film and she is looking gorgeous. Sonu Sood comes up with another dazzling performance after magnum opus Arundathi. Director Puri Jagannadh just played routine stuff in this film. The presentation and narration are very weak, lacking all seriousness. The dialogues are to some extent good. The screenplay was not impressive and there a lot many illogical threads. local review sites Greatandhra gave two and a half rating and Idlebrain gave a three-star says "On a whole, Ek Niranjan is a not a bad film. The first half of the movie is entertaining and the second half should have been better".

Box office
Ek Niranjan was released all over Andhra Pradesh with over 350 prints in 700 theaters and the hype was outstanding due to the combination of Prabhas and Puri. The film grossed Rs. 210 million in its first week.

Awards
57th Filmfare Awards South
Nominated – Filmfare Award for Best Actor – Telugu – Prabhas

Soundtrack

The music is composed by Mani Sharma. The soundtrack contains six songs and featured throughout the film. The audio release was held on 25 September and was an elaborate event. Prabhas, Kangana Ranaut, Allu Arjun, Puri Jagannadh presented the music at the event.

References

External links

2009 films
Indian action films
2000s Hindi-language films
Films directed by Puri Jagannadh
Films scored by Mani Sharma
Films shot in Switzerland
Films shot in Bangkok
Films shot in Thailand
Films shot in Hyderabad, India
2009 action films